Swapnil Sanjay Munot  is an Indian actor & producer, known for Triple Seat (2019) Kho-Kho (2013) and Aga Bai Arechyaa 2 (2015).

Early life 
Swapnil born on 2 November 1988 in Ahmednagar, Maharastra and graduated from Ahmenagar college. He began his career at an early age as a child actor. He continued his interest in acting in school, college and won some awards at the state level in drama competitions.

Career 
He started his career in 2013  as an actor in Kedaar Shinde's movie Kho Kho later becomes a producer of Triple Seat & Zee Yuva’s serial Tuza Maza Jamtay. In 2015, he was in the production for movie named Agabai Arechya 2. Later, he started his own film production house Ahmednagar Film Company in 2016. He is the founding member of play competition, Ekankika Ahmednagar Mahakarandak  and also have a Youtube channel Kadak Marathi under the banner of Kadak Entertainment.

Filmography

References

External links 

1988 births
Living people
Indian male film actors
21st-century Indian male actors